Elachista quadripunctella is a moth of the family Elachistidae. It is found from Scandinavia and Latvia to the Pyrenees and Italy and from France to Romania.

The wingspan is 10–12 mm.

The larvae feed on Carex flacca, Luzula luzuloides, Luzula pilosa and Luzula sylvatica. They mine the leaves of their host plant. The mine starts at the leaf tip and has the form of a large, elongate, lower-surface epidermal blotch. Later, larvae feed on the parenchyma and the leaf tip with the upper part of the mine shrivels into a narrow tube. Here, the frass is deposited. A single larva makes several mines. Pupation takes place within the mine. They are colourless. Larvae can be found from the end of September to the following spring.

References

quadripunctella
Moths described in 1825
Moths of Europe